Encore! is the third album by German countertenor Klaus Nomi, released posthumously in 1983. It is partly a compilation of previous works, with some new work added.

Nomi died earlier that year.

Track listing
"Fanfare" – 0:40
"The Cold Song" – 4:03
"Total Eclipse" (Live Version) – 4:15
"Can't Help Falling in Love" – 3:55
"Simple Man" – 4:17
"Wasting My Time" – 4:14
"Wayward Sisters (From "Dido & Aeneas")" – 1:43
"Ding Dong" – 3:03
"You Don't Own Me" – 3:39
"Der Nussbaum" – 3:03
"Lightning Strikes" – 2:59
"The Twist" – 3:10
"Samson and Deliah (Aria)" – 3:52

"Fanfare" is an instrumental track. "Total Eclipse (live version)", "Can't Help Falling in Love" and "Der Nussbaum" are previously unreleased.

References

Klaus Nomi albums
Compilation albums published posthumously
1983 compilation albums
RCA Records compilation albums